Barden and Ribee Saddlery is a heritage-listed former saddlery at 473 High Street, Maitland, City of Maitland, New South Wales, Australia. It was added to the New South Wales State Heritage Register on 2 April 1999.

History 

Barden & Ribee Pty Ltd was a successful Maitland saddlery business, which had been established in 1872 as a partnership between Thomas J. Ribee and J. W. Barden. The building was built in 1888 as new premises for the company, which required larger premises due to increased business. It was designed by John W. Pender and built by Robert James. The ground floor was used as retail premises, while the second-floor was a storeroom, with a workroom also on-site.

The business remained in their families after the death of the initial partners.

The business closed  1970s and sold the premises in 1978.

It has been converted to a restaurant, but retains evidence of its former use as a saddlery.

Description

It is a two-storey brick commercial building in the Victorian Free Classical style. It retains the original signage on the building's second-floor exterior and above a ground-floor window.

The City of Maitland describes it as "an excellent example of Victorian commercial premises" and states that it is an "important record of the pattern of commercial development and of a saddlery as interpretation of reliance on horses for local transport in the nineteenth century".

Heritage listing 
Barden & Ribee Saddlery was listed on the New South Wales State Heritage Register on 2 April 1999.

See also

References

Attribution

External links

New South Wales State Heritage Register
Maitland, New South Wales
Commercial buildings in New South Wales
Articles incorporating text from the New South Wales State Heritage Register